The 2016–17 Mercer Bears men's basketball team represented Mercer University during the 2016–17 NCAA Division I men's basketball season. The Bears, led by ninth-year head coach Bob Hoffman, played their home games at Hawkins Arena on the university's Macon, Georgia campus as third-year members of the Southern Conference. They finished the season 15–17, 9–9 in SoCon play to finish in sixth place. They lost in the quarterfinals of the SoCon tournament to East Tennessee State.

Previous season
The Bears finished the 2015–16 season 19–15, 8–10 in SoCon play to finish in seventh place. They defeated The Citadel in the first round of the SoCon tournament to advance to the quarterfinals where they lost to East Tennessee State. They were invited to the CollegeInsider.com Tournament where they lost in the first round to Coastal Carolina.

Murder of Jibri Bryan
Jibri Bryan, a sixth-year senior, was shot and killed on February 2, 2016. He was found with a gunshot wound to the head in the driver's seat of a Chevy Monte Carlo parked in a convenience store in Macon, Georgia. Bryan played in six games in the 2015–16 season due to a knee injury, averaging 7.8 points per game. Jarvis Clinton Miller has been charged in the murder of Bryan after attempting to flee from the crime scene. In a statement, Mercer coach Bob Hoffman said, "Jibri Bryan was a special young man who was a great contributor to our team and did everything that was asked of him.

Roster

Schedule and results

 
|-
! colspan="9" style=| Non-conference regular season

|-
! colspan="9" style=| SoCon regular season

|-
! colspan="9" style=| SoCon tournament

References

Mercer Bears men's basketball seasons
Mercer
Mercer Bears
Mercer Bears